Claude Jutra (March 11, 1930 – November 5, 1986) was a Canadian actor, film director, and screenwriter.

The Prix Jutra, and the Academy of Canadian Cinema and Television's Claude Jutra Award, were named in his honour because of his importance in Quebec cinema history. The awards were renamed in 2016 following the publication of allegations that he had sexually abused children during his lifetime, as were streets named for him.

Life and career
Jutra was born and raised in Montreal, Quebec as Claude Jutras. His father, Albert Jutras, was a radiologist and a director of the Collège des médecins du Québec. He made the short films Dément du lac Jean-Jeunes and Perpetual Movement (Mouvement perpétuel) before graduating from the Université de Montréal with a degree in medicine, but turned to filmmaking instead of medical practice after completing his degree. He studied theatre in Montréal (1952–53) and wrote his first original Quebec television play (L'Ecole de la peur) in 1953, and a television series, Images en boite, in 1954.

He went to work at the National Film Board of Canada in 1956 where he trained in all facets of filmmaking, although his first film for the NFB, Trio-Brio, was permanently lost when the organization moved its head office from Ottawa to Montreal. As a filmmaker, he dropped the s from his surname, a common Québécois surname, because the Jutra spelling was more distinctive. In 1958 he went to France and Africa to work with noted French filmmaker, Jean Rouch.

Claude Jutra's career in film, in a certain sense, paralleled Quebec cinema itself. Beginning as an amateur at a time when there was no Quebec cinema, he participated in (and sometime led) several of the principal developments in Quebec: traditional documentaries and docudramas at the NFB; the germinal period of direct cinema; the first steps in the early 1960s toward independent film production; and later trend toward large-budget features, such as Kamouraska, a box office failure now revealed to be a major work in the canon of Canadian cinema. Overall, his work had a consistent thematic pattern: young people and the (often traumatic) passage from innocence to knowledge, a theme that has nostalgic overtones.

With financing and production provided by the NFB, Jutra co-wrote and directed the 1971 film Mon oncle Antoine, which until very recently has been ranked as the best Canadian movie ever made. As well as directing several cinema vérité shorts such as Wrestling and The Devil's Toy, he also co-directed with Norman McLaren and starred in the innovative pixilation Academy Award-nominated short A Chairy Tale.

He was offered the Order of Canada in 1972 but declined because he was a Quebec separatist. In 1984, he was awarded the Prix Albert-Tessier, given to individuals for an outstanding career in Québec cinema.

Death
Jutra was diagnosed with early-onset Alzheimer's disease in the early 1980s. He was reported missing on November 5, 1986. His body was found in the St. Lawrence River in April 1987, with a note in his pocket reading "Je m'appelle Claude Jutra" ("My name is Claude Jutra"); an autopsy later confirmed drowning as his cause of death.

Controversy
In 2016, 30 years after Jutra's death, journalist Yves Lever wrote in the book Claude Jutra, biographie and claimed that Jutra was a pederast. Lever said that "one of Jutra's victims was under 14 years old." He also maintained that Jutra's proclivities were known by many people in the industry, "but nobody made a big deal out of it." Lever's allegations were not officially proven, as no victims publicly came forward; however, in the wake of the allegations, Québec Cinéma held an emergency meeting to discuss changing the name of the Prix Jutra.

On February 17, 2016, La Presse published an interview with an alleged victim of Jutra, who requested to remain anonymous, relating sexual contact ranging from embrace to oral sex from the time the victim was 6 to 16. On the same day and based on the information in the same article, the Minister of Culture of Quebec Hélène David asked Cinéma Québec to remove the name Jutra from its prizes recognizing cinematic achievements in Quebec, which they did. She also mandated the Commission de toponymie (Quebec Toponymy Commission), a sub-agency of Office québécois de la langue française which reports to the Minister of Culture, to assemble a list of all streets and public places in the province bearing the name Jutra. On the same day, Montreal mayor Denis Coderre announced that the city would remove Jutra's name from streets and parks in its jurisdiction.

Of the controversy, The Globe and Mail wrote: "Few legendary figures have fallen so quickly and so completely. Merely 24 hours after the official publication of the first explosive allegation of child abuse against the Canadian cinematic pioneer, the film industry and governments started scrubbing the name Claude Jutra from every trophy, park and street."

Selected films

As actor
A Chairy Tale - 1957
À tout prendre - 1964
The Rape of a Sweet Young Girl (Le viol d'une jeune fille douce) - 1968
Préambule - 1969
Act of the Heart - 1970
We Are Far from the Sun (On est loin du soleil) - 1971
Mon oncle Antoine -1971
Love on the Nose - 1974 (TV)
Pour le meilleur et pour le pire - 1975
La fleur aux dents - 1976
Arts Cuba - 1977 (voice)
Two Solitudes - 1978
Riel - 1979 (TV)
Till Death Do Us Part - 1982 (TV)
The Tin Flute (Bonheur d'occasion) - 1983

As director
Jutra made his debut as a director with Le dément du lac Jean-Jeunes - it explored themes that remained throughout his work, a nostalgia for childhood, madness, and troubled waters.

His collaboration with Michel Brault began at this early period. Mouvement perpétuel was influenced by Jean Cocteau's Le Sang d'un poète. L'École de la peur (1953) was the first television film made in Quebec. Toward the end of the 1950s, he moved to France, and François Truffaut, who became a friend, asked him to direct Anna la Bonne (1959), a Cocteau scenario. In 1960, Jutra returned to Canada.

Fiction
Le dément du lac Jean-Jeunes - 1948, short film
Perpetual Movement (Mouvement perpétuel) - 1949, short film
L'école de la peur - 1953, TV movie
Pierrot des bois - 1956, short film
A Chairy Tale - 1957 short animated film co-directed with Norman McLaren
Les mains nettes - 1958
Anna la bonne - 1959, short film from a scenario by Jean Cocteau
À tout prendre - 1963
Marie-Christine - 1970, short film
Mon oncle Antoine - 1971
Kamouraska - 1973
For Better or For Worse (Pour le meilleur et pour le pire) - 1975
Ada - 1977, TV movie created for anthology series For the Record
Dreamspeaker - 1977, TV movie created for anthology series For the Record
Seer Was Here - 1977, TV movie created for anthology series For the Record
The Patriarch - 1978, episode of The Beachcombers
The Wordsmith - 1979, TV movie
Surfacing - 1980
By Design - 1981
Un petit bonhomme de chemin - 1982, unfinished film
The Dame in Colour (La dame en couleurs) - 1985
My Father, My Rival - 1985, TV movie

Documentaries
Au service de l'esprit troublé (Short film Co-Directed with Stanley Jackson, 1955)
Chantons maintenant (Short film, 1956)
Jeunesses musicales (Short film, 1956)
Rondo de Mozart (Short film, 1957)
Félix Leclerc, troubadour (Short film, 1958)
Fred Barry, comédien (Short film, 1959)
Le Niger, jeune république (Short film, 1961)
La Lutte (Wrestling) (Short film Co-Directed with Marcel Carrière, Claude Fournier and Michel Brault, 1961)
Québec-U.S.A. ou l'invasion pacifique (Short film Co-Directed with Michel Brault, 1962)
Petit discours de la méthode (Short film Co-Directed with Pierre Patry, 1963)
Ciné boum (Short film Co-Directed with Robert Russell, 1964)
Comment savoir... (1966)
The Devil's Toy (Short film, 1966)
Au coeur de la ville (Short film, 1969)
Wow (1969)
Québec fête juin '75 (Co-Directed with Jean-Claude Labrecque, 1976)
Arts Cuba (Short film, 1977)

Awards and nominations 

Canadian Film Awards

(1950) Canadian Film Award, Amateur for Perpetual Movement (Mouvement perpétuel)
(1958) Canadian Film Award, Arts and Experimental for A Chairy Tale (shared with Norman McLaren)
(1964) Canadian Film Award, Feature Film for À tout prendre (shared with Robert Hershorn)
(1971) Canadian Film Award, Direction (Feature) for Mon Oncle Antoine
(1977) Canadian Film Award, Direction (Non-Feature) for Dreamspeaker

Genie Awards

(1986) Genie Award, Best Achievement in Direction for The Lady in Colours (La Dame en couleurs)
(1986) Genie Award, Best Screenplay for The Lady in Colours (La Dame en couleurs)

Film about Claude Jutra
Jutra's close friend, filmmaker Paule Baillargeon, directed the feature documentary Claude Jutra: An Unfinished Story in 2002.

Marie-Josée Saint-Pierre used a mix of archival footage of Jutra with animation to create the 2014 short documentary film Jutra.

Legacy
George Lucas stated in an interview that he shot the first Star Wars film like a Jutra documentary.

Besides the film awards (Claude Jutra Award and Jutra Award), a number of places bear or bore Jutra's name, all found in Quebec:

 Claude-Jutra Crescent, Montreal
 Claude-Jutra Park, Montreal
 Place Claude-Jutra, Repentigny, Quebec
 Claude-Jutra Street, Blainville, Quebec
 Claude-Jutra Street, Saint-Bruno-de-Montarville
 Claude-Jutra Street, Quebec City
 Claude-Jutra Street, Levis, Quebec
 Jutra Street, Candiac

Multiple parks and streets later were renamed or scheduled to be renamed after the pederasty controversy in 2016.

Further reading
Books and thesis
 CARRIER-LAFLEUR, Thomas, Une philosophie du « temps à l'état pur ». L'autofiction chez Proust et Jutra, Paris : Librairie philosophique J. Vrin, Québec : Les Presses de l'Université Laval (Zêtêsis : Esthétiques), 2010, 215 p.
 GARNEAU, Michèle, « Pour une esthétique du cinéma québécois », Thèse de doctorat en Littérature comparée, option théorie et épistémologie, Montréal, Université de Montréal, 1997.
 LEACH, Jim, Claude Jutra filmmaker, Montreal/Kingston/London/Ithaca, McGill-Queen's University Press (Films Studies), 1999, XII-306 p.
 

Articles
 BELLEMARE, Denis, « Narcissisme et corps spectatorielle », in Cinémas, vol. nos 1-2, fall 1996, p. 37-54.
 BRADY, James, « À tout prendre : fragments du corps spéculaire », in Copie Zéro, Revue de cinéma, no 37 (October 1988), p. 23-26.
 MARSOLAIS, Gilles, « À tout prendre », in Lettres et écritures, Revue des Étudiants de la Faculté des Lettres de l'Université de Montréal, vol. I, no 2 (February 1964), p. 35-41.
 MARSOLAIS, Gilles, « Au delà du miroir... », in Cinéma : acte et présence, Québec, Éditions Nota bene, 1999, p. 189-203.
 WAUGH, Thomas, « Je ne le connais pas tant que ça: Claude Jutra », in Nouvelles « vues » sur le cinéma québécois (on line), no 2, summer-fall 2004.
 SIROIS-TRAHAN, Jean-Pierre, « Le devenir-québécois chez Claude Jutra. Autofiction, politique de l'intime et le je comme faux raccords », in Nouvelles « vues » sur le cinéma québécois (on line), no 11, fall 2010.

References

External links
Je m’appelle Claude Jutra, an online exhibition (In French)
Canadian Film Encyclopedia

1930 births
1986 suicides
20th-century Canadian male actors
Canadian male film actors
Canadian male television actors
Canadian screenwriters in French
Film directors from Montreal
French Quebecers
LGBT film directors
Canadian LGBT screenwriters
Canadian gay writers
Male actors from Montreal
National Film Board of Canada people
Suicides by drowning in Canada
Suicides in Quebec
Writers from Montreal
Best Director Genie and Canadian Screen Award winners
People with Alzheimer's disease
Prix Albert-Tessier winners
20th-century Canadian screenwriters
1986 deaths
20th-century Canadian LGBT people
Gay screenwriters